The Tuttle Farm of Dover, New Hampshire, United States, is located between the tidal waters of the Bellamy and Piscataqua rivers on Dover Point, and has been operating continuously since 1632.

Tuttle Farm, now known as Tender Crop, has often been referred to as the oldest known family-owned farm in the United States; however, this claim has been challenged. The Shirley Plantation in Charles City, Virginia, was founded in 1613 and has been in operation since 1638.

History
The Tuttle Farm has been passed down across eleven generations of Tuttles from father to son since John Tuttle arrived in the New World bearing a land grant from Charles II of England. The original  parcel granted to John Tuttle was expanded over time and reached  at its peak during the twentieth century.

There was one break in the father and son chain of ownership of the farm when Joseph Edward Tuttle died while his only son was a baby. Joseph's brother William Tuttle inherited the farm upon Joseph's death and served as caretaker of the farm for 40 years until his own death in 1911, at which point ownership of the farm passed to George Tuttle, the then mature son of Joseph Edward Tuttle.

Farm buildings and crops
The Tuttle Farm compound includes the Tuttles' twelve-room antique colonial residence (circa 1780) which has been updated, greenhouses, storage barns and a modern retail facility. The Tuttle Farm currently cultivates  of vegetables and berries.  The farm's largest crop is sweet corn. 25% of the Tuttle Farm is classified as wetland and 60% is wooded.

The Tuttle Farm includes a modern upscale  retail facility constructed in 1987 adjoining an old New England barn, the original "Tuttle's Red Barn".  The retail facility conducts business as "Tuttle's Red Barn" and sells Tuttle's own produce, a variety of groceries, plants, gift items and gourmet foods from many countries.

Sale 
Will Tuttle (William Penn Tuttle III) was the last Tuttle owner of Tuttle Farm. Will Tuttle and his older sister, Lucy Alger Tuttle, were the co-owners of Tuttle's Red Barn.

In 2007, Will Tuttle sold a conservation easement on the Tuttle Farm to the Strafford Rivers Conservancy for $2.79 million, with funding provided by the City of Dover ($1.195 million), the New Hampshire Department of Transportation ($1.34 million) and the Federal Farm and Ranchland Protection Program ($155,643).

On July 25, 2010, the Tuttle Farm and Tuttle's Red Barn were listed for sale. Will Tuttle, the Tuttle Farm's owner, cited exhaustion, his age (in his sixties) and the lack of a younger generation of Tuttles showing interest in taking over the Tuttle Farm as his reasons for offering the farm for sale.

The original price was $3.35 million. Foster's Daily Democrat reports it sold in October 2013 for a little over $1 million to Matt Kozazcki, who owns a farm in Newbury, Massachusetts.

References

External links
 LIFE Magazine (Sept. 17, 1971) article about Tuttle farm

Buildings and structures in Dover, New Hampshire
Farms in New Hampshire
1632 establishments in the Thirteen Colonies
Buildings and structures completed in 1632
Companies based in Strafford County, New Hampshire